Scaramanga may refer to:

Place
Skaramagas, Greece

People
 James Scaramanga (1898–1918), First World War Greek-British flying ace credited with twelve aerial victories
 Francisco Scaramanga, a fictional James Bond character from The Man with the Golden Gun

Sports
 The Scaramanga Roped Race,  a Swiss ski race

Music
Jonny Scaramanga, guitarist on Kee Marcello album Redux: Europe
"Scaramanga/The Force" (Feat. Fergie) from album Agnelli & Nelson
Scaramanga, DJ featured on DJ-Kicks: Stereo MCs
The Scaramanga Six, English rock band
"Scaramanga", a 1989 song by Dan Hartman from album New Green Clear Blue
"Scaramanga", song by Raging Speedhorn from We Will Be Dead Tomorrow